This is a list of Moscow State Institute of International Relations (MGIMO-University) alumni.

Alumni

Heads of state or government 
Petar Mladenov, former President of Bulgaria
Ilham Aliyev, President of Azerbaijan
Kassym-Jomart Tokayev, President of Kazakhstan 
Kirsan Ilyumzhinov, President of Kalmykia (a region of Russia)
Andrey Lukanov, former Prime Minister of Bulgaria
Zhan Videnov, former Prime Minister of Bulgaria

Ministers, diplomats and politicians 
Gankhuurai Battungalag, Mongolian diplomat
Irina Bokova, former Ambassador of Bulgaria to France, Director-General of UNESCO
Sergei Lavrov, minister of Foreign Affairs of Russia, former Russia's ambassador to the United Nations
Andrei Kozyrev, minister of foreign affairs of Russia
Maroš Šefčovič, Vice-President of the European Commission and European Commissioner for Inter-Institutional Relations and Administration (2009 - ), former Slovak Permanent Representative to the European Union (2004-2009)
Georgiy Mamedov, Ambassador of Russia to Canada
Pulat Abdullayev, former Ambassador of Russia to Cameroon
Anatoly Adamishin, former Ambassador to Italy, first deputy Foreign Minister
Nikolay Afanasevsky, former Ambassador to Belgium and France
Aleksandr Avdeyev, former Ambassador of Russia to France, Minister for Culture of Russia
Alexei Bogaturov, International Trends founder and first editor-in-chief, Distinguished Scholar of Russia
Valentin Bogomazov, former Ambassador to Ecuador, Peru
Roza Chemeris, member of the State Duma
Aleksandr Churilin, Ambassador to Romania (2006-2011)
Vitaly Churkin, former Permanent Representative of the Russian Federation to the United Nations
Vyacheslav Dolgov, former Ambassador to Australia, Belarus
Anatoly Dryukov, former Ambassador to Singapore, India, Armenia
Yuri Fedotov, former Ambassador of Russia to the United Kingdom, Executive Director of the UNODC
Štefan Füle, European Commissioner for Enlargement and European Neighbourhood Policy, former Czech Minister of European Affairs and Czech Ambassador to the NATO
Oleg Gordievsky, KGB officer and defector
Vladimir Grinin, Ambassador to Germany, Switzerland
Yerlan Idrissov, politician, Ambassador of Kazakhstan to USA 
Olga Ivanova, Ambassador to Mauritius
Nikolai Kozyrev, Ambassador to Ireland (1991-1998)
Sergei Kirpichenko, Ambassador to United Arab Emirates (1998-2000), Libya (2000-2004), Syria (2006-2011), Egypt (2011-2019)
Oleg Krivonogov, Ambassador to Luxembourg (1997-2001)
Ján Kubiš, former minister of foreign affairs of Slovakia (2006-2009), former Organization for Security and Co-operation in Europe secretary general
Eduard Kukan, Member of European Parliament (2009-), former minister of foreign affairs of Slovakia (1994, 1998-2006)
Yuri Kuplyakov, former Ambassador to Nigeria
Miroslav Lajčák, Minister of Foreign and European Affairs of Slovak Republic (2009-2010, 2012- ), former President of the United Nations General Assembly (2017), former Managing Director for Russia, Eastern Neighbourhood and the Western Balkans in the EU's External Action Service (2010-2012), High Representative for Bosnia and Herzegovina
Iurie Leancă, diplomat and Foreign Minister of Moldova
Nikolai Leonov, politician, KGB 
Alexander Losyukov, former Ambassador to New Zealand
Vladimir Malygin, Ambassador to Malta
Grigoriy Marchenko, Governor of the National Bank of Kazakhstan
Sergei Martynov, minister of foreign affairs of Belarus
Hang Chuon Naron, Cambodian minister of education
Yuri Nosenko, KGB officer and defector
Alexei Obukhov, politician, diplomat and Deputy Foreign Minister of USSR
Atanas Paparizov, member of the European Parliament from Bulgaria, former minister
Lukáš Parízek, State Secretary of the Ministry of Foreign and European Affairs of the Slovak Republic and Special Representative for the Slovak OSCE Chairmanship
Sergei M. Plekhanov, political scientist, former deputy director of the Institute of the US and Canada at the Russian Academy of Sciences
Alexey Podberezkin, politician, professor, candidate for president in 2000 Russian presidential election
Andrei Polyakov, Ambassador to  Tunisia (2006-2011), Rwanda (2013-2017)
Konstantin Provalov, Ambassador to Estonia (2000-2006)
Mircea Răceanu, Romanian diplomat
Leonid Shebarshin, KGB officer
Vasily Sidorov, diplomat, Deputy Foreign Minister of Russia,  Permanent Representative of Russia to the UN Office and other International Organizations in Geneva
Filipp Sidorsky, Ambassador to Uzbekistan (1992-1997), and Bosnia and Herzegovina (1998-2000)
Kassym-Jomart Tokayev, Chairman of the Senate of Kazakhstan
Tibor Toth, Executive Secretary, provisional technical secretariat, Comprehensive Nuclear-Test-Ban Treaty Organization 
Nikolay N. Udovichenko, Ambassador of Russia to Nigeria
Grigol Vashadze, minister of foreign affairs of Georgia
Sergey Yastrzhembsky, former Russian envoy to the EU

Business 
Alisher Usmanov, Uzbek-born billionaire and Chairman of Gazprominvestholding, alleged to have bribed Prime Minister Dmitry Medvedev
Patokh Chodiev, Belgian-Uzbek billionaire oligarch 
Vladimir Potanin, billionaire and president of Interros holding
Alexander Lebedev, billionaire and Russian oligarch
Nikolai N. Inozemtsev, deputy director of Gosplan
Marek Dospiva, Czech top-manager, Penta Brokers s.r.o.
Jaroslav Haščák, Slovak top-manager, Penta Brokers s.r.o.
Felix Vulis, Chief Executive of Eurasian Natural Resources Corporation plc (ENRC)

Journalism 
Bilkisu Yusuf, Nigerian journalist, columnist and editor, Muslim, feminist, and advocate for interfaith society
Ksenia Sobchak, Russian TV anchor, journalist, politician, socialite and actress
Vladimir R. Legoyda

Arts and literature 
Luba Sterlikova, artist, author
Sergo Mikoyan, Soviet and Armenian historian

Academics 
Anatoly Torkunov, rector of the Institute
Alexandru Şoltoianu, lecturer Moldova State University, a founder of the National Patriotic Front and political prisoner
Alexei Bogaturov, international relations scholar

Cinema 
 Nadezhda Mikhalkova, actress

External links 
MGIMO-University official website 
Alumni Association of MGIMO-University

Moscow State Institute of International Relations